Doa raspa is a moth of the Doidae family. It is found in Central America, including Belize.

External links
Moths of Belize

Doidae